Amadeus VIII (4 September 1383 – 7 January 1451), nicknamed the Peaceful, was Count of Savoy from 1391 to 1416 and Duke of Savoy from 1416 to 1440. He was the son of Amadeus VII, Count of Savoy and Bonne of Berry. He was a claimant to the papacy from 1439 to 1449 as Felix V in opposition to Popes Eugene IV and Nicholas V, and is considered the last historical antipope.

Count and duke
Amadeus was born in Chambéry on 4 September 1383. He became count of Savoy in 1391 after his father's death, with his mother acting as regent until 1397, during his minority reign. His early rule saw the centralization of power and the territorial expansion of the Savoyard state, and in 1416 Amadeus was elevated by Emperor Sigismund to duke of Savoy. In 1418, his distant cousin Louis of Piedmont, his brother-in-law, the last male of the elder branch of House of Savoy, died, leaving Amadeus as his heir-general, thus finally uniting the male-lines of the House of Savoy.

Amadeus increased his dominions and encouraged several attempts to negotiate an end to the Hundred Years' War. From 1401 to 1422, he campaigned to recover the area around Geneva and Annecy. After the death of his wife in 1428, he founded the Order of Saint Maurice with six other knights in 1434. They lived alone in the castle of Ripaille, near Geneva, in a quasi-monastic state according to a rule drawn up by himself. He appointed his son Louis regent of the duchy.

Antipope

Amadeus was sympathetic to conciliarism, the movement to have the Church managed by Ecumenical councils, and to prelates like Cardinal Aleman of Arles, who wanted to set limits upon the doctrine of Papal supremacy. He had close relations with the Council of Basel (1431-1449), even after most of its members joined the Council of Florence, convened by Pope Eugene IV in 1438. The Cardinal of Arles reminded the Council that they needed a rich and powerful pope to defend it from its adversaries. The rump council at Basel elected Amadeus as Pope Felix V in October 1439. After long negotiations with a deputation from the council, Amadeus acquiesced in the election on 5 February 1440. He took the inaugural oath formulated by the Basel council; the only pope or antipope to do so. At the same time, he completely renounced  all further participation in the government of his domains: he named his son Louis Duke of Savoy, and his son Philip Count of Geneva. He is also credited with formalizing the academic lectures held in Basel by establishing a University for the Clergy which would eventually lead to the foundation of the University of Basel in 1460.

There is no evidence that he intrigued to obtain the papal office by sending the bishops of Savoy to Basel. Of the twelve bishops present, seven were Savoyards. His reputation is marred by the account of him as a pontiff concerned with money, to avoid disadvantaging his heirs, found in the Commentaries of Pius II.

Amadeus is considered an antipope. He served from November 1439 to April 1449.  After the death of his opponent Pope Eugene IV in 1447, both sides of the church favoured a settlement of the schism, and in 1449 he accepted the authority of Pope Nicholas V.

Later life
After renouncing his claim, Amadeus was appointed papal legate to Savoy. He died in Geneva in 7 January 1451.

Marriage and issue
He married Mary of Burgundy (1386–1422), daughter of Philip the Bold. They had nine children, only four of whom lived to mature adulthood:
 Margaret of Savoy (13 May 1405 – 1418).
 Anthony of Savoy (September 1407 – bef. 12 December 1407).
 Anthony of Savoy (1408 – aft. 10 October 1408).
 Marie (end January 1411 – 22 February 1469), married Filippo Maria Visconti, duke of Milan.
 Amadeus of Savoy (26 Mar 1412 – 17 August 1431), Prince of Piedmont, the heir apparent until his premature death. 
 Louis (24 February 1413 – 29 January 1465), his successor.
 Bonne of Savoy (September 1415 – 25 September 1430).
 Philip of Savoy (1417 – 3 March 1444), Count of Genève
 Margaret (7 August 1420 – 30 September 1479), married firstly Louis III, titular king of Naples, secondly Louis IV, Count Palatine of the Rhine and thirdly Ulrich V, Count of Württemberg.

Notes

Citations

Sources
 Andenmatten, B.; Paravicini Bagliani, A. (ed.) (1992). Amédée VIII-Félix V, premier duc de Savoie et pape (1383-1451). Colloque international, Ripaille-Lausanne, 23-26 octobre 1990. Lausanne 1992. 
 Bruchet, M. (1907). Le château de Ripaille Paris 1907. See: pp. 49–182. 
 Cognasso, Francesco (1930). Amadeo VIII (1383-1451). 2 vols. Turin, 1930. 

 
 Hildesheimer, E. (1970). "Le Pape du Concile, Amédée VIII de Savoie," Annales de la Société des Lettres, Sciences et Arts des Alpes-Maritime, 61 (1969-1970), pp. 41–48.

External links
 Cognasso, Francesco (2000). "FELICE V, antipapa". Enciclopedia dei Papi (Treccani 2000) 

 

1383 births
1451 deaths
14th-century Counts of Savoy
15th-century Dukes of Savoy
Princes of Savoy
People from Chambéry
Counts of Geneva
Monarchs who abdicated
Felix V
15th-century Italian cardinals
Cardinal-bishops of Sabina
Medieval child monarchs
Deans of the College of Cardinals
15th-century antipopes
People excommunicated by the Catholic Church